Reference date may mean:
 Reference date (United States business cycles)
 See Epoch (reference date) for information on dates used as reference points for calendars and time standards